Víctor Manuel Barbosa Borges (born 24 May 1955 in Assomada, Santa Catarina, Santiago) is a Cape Verdean politician. He was appointed as Minister of Foreign Affairs of the country in April 2004. In April 2004, he visited Paris, France.  A year later, he made another visite to France and met Mme. Brigitte Girardin on October 7.  On October 30, 2006, he made his third visit to Paris and signed the Partnership Document.  In November 2007, he signed a Special Partnership with the European Union.  Borges visited Paris again in 2008 and met with M. Joyandet, Secretary of State of Cooperation and Francophony state and M. Hortefeux, Minister of Immigration, Integration, National Identity and Co-Development. After four years in that position, he was replaced and left out of the government that was named on 27 June 2008.

References

1955 births
Living people
Foreign ministers of Cape Verde
People from Santa Catarina, Cape Verde